The 1978 Virginia Slims of Philadelphia  was a women's tennis tournament played on indoor carpet courts at the Palestra in Philadelphia, Pennsylvania in the United States that was part of the 1978 Virginia Slims World Championship Series. It was the seventh edition of the tournament and was held from March 20 through March 26, 1978. First-seeded Chris Evert won the singles title and earned $20,000 first-prize money.

Winners

Singles

 Chris Evert defeated  Billie Jean King 6–0, 6–4

Doubles

 Kerry Melville /  Anne Smith defeated  Françoise Dürr /  Virginia Wade 6–3, 7–5

Prize money

References

External links
 ITF tournament edition details
 WTA tournament details

Virginia Slims of Philadelphia
Advanta Championships of Philadelphia
Virginia Slims of Philadelphia
Virginia Slims of Philadelphia
Virginia Slims of Philadelphia